James Henderson Berry (May 15, 1841 – January 30, 1913) was a  United States Senator and served as the 14th governor of Arkansas.

Early life

James Henderson Berry was born in Jackson County, Alabama, to Isabella Jane (née Orr) and James McFerrin Berry. The family moved to Arkansas in 1848. Berry attended Berryville Academy in Berryville, Arkansas, for one year. The academy was named after his family. Berry studied law and in 1866 was admitted to the Arkansas bar.

American Civil War
At the outbreak of the American Civil War, Berry joined the Confederate States Army and was commissioned as a second lieutenant with Company E, 16th Arkansas Infantry. Berry lost his right leg during the Battle of Corinth in northern Mississippi.  After recuperating from his wound, he worked as a school teacher and started a private law practice.

Political career
Berry was elected to the Arkansas House of Representatives in 1866. He was reelected in 1872 and in 1874. In his last term he was selected to be Speaker of the House. Berry was the chairman of the Democratic State Convention in 1876. In 1878 he became a judge for the Fourth Circuit Court and served in that post until 1882 when he was elected Governor of Arkansas. The Berry administration focused on reducing the state debt and creating a state mental hospital. Berry did not run for reelection. In March 1885, Berry was selected by the legislature to fill the unexpired term of Senator Augustus H. Garland. Berry remained in the U.S. Senate for the next 22 years.

Later life
In 1910, Berry accepted a position with the Arkansas History Commission to mark the graves of all Arkansas Confederate soldiers who had died in northern prisons. Berry died in Bentonville, Arkansas, and is buried at the Knights of Pythias Cemetery (present-day Bentonville Cemetery), Bentonville, Arkansas.

Personal life
In 1865, Berry married E.Q. "Lizzie" Quaile. They had six children.

References

External links

 
Encyclopedia of Arkansas History & Culture entry: James Henderson Berry
1905 Full Portrait
National Governors Association

1841 births
1913 deaths
19th-century American politicians
American amputees
Arkansas lawyers
American politicians with disabilities
Arkansas state court judges
Confederate States Army officers
Deaths in Arkansas
Democratic Party governors of Arkansas
Democratic Party United States senators from Arkansas
People from Jackson County, Alabama
Speakers of the Arkansas House of Representatives
Democratic Party members of the Arkansas House of Representatives
19th-century American judges
19th-century American lawyers